Constantine ( or ; Latin: Cōnstantīnus, Greek: , Kōnstantînos) is a masculine and feminine (in French for example) given name and surname which is derived from the Latin name Constantinus, a hypocoristic of the first names Constans and Constantius, both meaning "constant, steadfast" in Latin. The popularity stems from the eleven Roman and Byzantine emperors, beginning with St. Constantine I (the Great). 

The names are the Latin equivalents of the Bulgarian name 'Костадин' and the Greek name Eustáthios (Εὐστάθιος),  meaning the same, not changing, standing. The name "Constantine" is still very common in Greece and Cyprus, the forms Κώστας (Kostas), Κωστής (Kostis) and Ντίνος (Dinos) being popular hypocoristics. Costel is a common Romanian form, a diminutive of Constantin. The Bulgarian, Russian and Serbian form is Konstantin (Константин),and their short forms Kostya and Kosta, respectively. The Ukrainian form of the name is Kostyantyn (Костянтин). The name is common among Eastern Orthodox people in Albania, in the form of Kostandin, Kostantin or Kosta. The name is also found in other languages of Western Europe such as Considine in Irish or Còiseam in Scottish Gaelic.

Constantine as a surname
Adrian Constantin, Romanian mathematician 
Con Constantine, Cypriot-Australian businessman
Dow Constantine, American politician
Eddie Constantine, French actor and singer
George Constantin, Romanian actor
George Constantine (racing driver), American race car driver
George Constantine (priest), British Protestant reformer
Irv Constantine, American football player
Jean Constantin, Romanian actor
John Constantine, fictional comic book occultist
Kevin Constantine, American ice hockey coach
Larry Constantine, computer science pioneer, writer
Learie Constantine, West Indian cricketer
Michael Constantine, American actor
Stavros Constantine, fictional character in Murder on the Orient Express
Storm Constantine, British science-fiction and fantasy author
Susannah Constantine, English fashion designer and style advisor
Thomas A. Constantine, American administrator to the DEA

Constantine as a given name
See: List of articles with forename Constantine

Constantine I of Greece
Constantine II of Greece
Constantine I, king of the Picts and was considered the second king of Scotland
Constantine II of Scotland
Constantine III of Scotland
Constantin Agiu
Constantin Alajalov
Constantine Andreou
Constantin Angelescu
Constantin Anghelache
Constantin Anton
Constantin Antoniade
Constantin Antoniades
Constantin Argetoianu 
Constantin C. Arion
Constantine Walter Benson
Constantin Bosianu
Constantin Brăiloiu
Constantin N. Brăiloiu
Constantin Brâncuși, Romanian-born sculptor who made his career in France
Constantine Bruno, Baron Kervyn de Lettenhove
Constantine W. Buckley
Constantin Budeanu
Constantin Cantacuzino, several people
Constantine P. Cavafy
Constantine Chibhi
Constantin Climescu
Constantin Costăchescu
Constantin A. Crețulescu
Constantin Cristescu
Constantin Dimitrescu
Constantin Dimitrescu-Iași
Constantine Doukas, Byzantine general and politician
Constantine Dragaš (>1355–1395), Serbian ruler
Constantin Eftimiu
Constantin Eraclide
Constantin Frosin
Constantin Grecescu
Constantin Iancovescu
Constantin Al. Ionescu-Caion
Constantin Isopescu-Grecul
Constantin Istrati
Constantine Kanaris, Greek admiral and statesman
Constantin Kirițescu
Constantine Koukias, Australian classical composer
Constantine Lascaris
Constantin Le Paige
Constantin Lecca
Constantin Levaditi
Constantine Manasses
Constantine Maroulis, American rock singer, actor and writer
Constantin Meissner
Constantin Miculescu
Constantin Mihail
Constantine Mitsotakis
Constantine Richard Moorsom
Constantin Niță
Constantin Noe
Constantine Overton (1626/7-?1690), Quaker leader in Shrewsbury, Shropshire 
Constantine Papadakis
Constantine Paparrigopoulos
Constantin Petrovicescu
Constantine Phaulkon
Constantine Phillips
Constantine Phipps, 1st Marquess of Normanby
Constantine Phipps, 2nd Baron Mulgrave
Constantin Pîrvulescu
Constantine Samuel Rafinesque
Constantin Andreas von Regel
Constantin Sandu
Constantin Sandu-Aldea
Constantine-Silvanus
Constantine Simitis
Constantine Joseph Smyth
Constantine Stilbes
Constantin T. Stoika
Constantin C. Teodorescu
Constantin Tobescu
Constantin Ucuta
Constantin Vișoianu

In popular culture

 John Constantine, a DC Comics character from the Hellblazer series
 Constantine (film), a film based on the DC Comics character
 Constantine (TV series), a TV show based on the DC Comics character

See also
Constantin
Konstantine

References

Unisex given names